The 2004–05 season was Aberdeen's 92nd season in the top flight of Scottish football and their 94th season overall. Aberdeen competed in the Scottish Premier League, Scottish League Cup, Scottish Cup.

Scottish Premier League

Scottish League Cup

Scottish Cup

Squad

 (Captain)

References

 AFC Heritage Trust

Aberdeen F.C. seasons
Aberdeen